Odian is a surname. Notable people with the name include::

 Krikor Odian (1834-1887),  Ottoman Armenian jurist, politician, and writer
 Yervant Odian (1869–1926), Ottoman Armenian satirist, journalist and playwright

See also
 Odean, given name and surname
 Odeon (disambiguation)
 Odia (disambiguation)